Arbeidernes blad (The Workers' Paper) was a Norwegian newspaper published in Ålesund from January to April 1898. The editorial team was a four-member committee consisting of Bernhard Riise (chief editor) and Erik Pettersen, and two other men named Langseth and Barstad. The newspaper was continued by Møringen, but that publication was also only published in 1898.

References

Defunct newspapers published in Norway
Norwegian-language newspapers
Mass media in Møre og Romsdal
Ålesund
Publications established in 1898
Publications disestablished in 1898